Painters Run is a  long 2nd order tributary to Chartiers Creek in Allegheny County, Pennsylvania.

Course
Painters Run rises in Mt. Lebanon, Pennsylvania, and then flows west to join Chartiers Creek at Kirwan Heights.

Watershed
Painters Run drains  of area, receives about 38.9 in/year of precipitation, has a wetness index of 339.89, and is about 7% forested.

See also
 List of rivers of Pennsylvania

References

Rivers of Pennsylvania
Rivers of Allegheny County, Pennsylvania